Montage Mountain is a ski area in Pennsylvania, located  from downtown Scranton, Pennsylvania. There are 26 trails, two terrain parks, and one of Pennsylvania's longest snow tubing areas.

History

Ownership 
From 1984 to 1991, Montage Mountain was owned and run by Montage, Inc, a non-profit corporation. The ski area was developed with a blend of public and private money. Public funding was provided by federal economic development funds and a county bond. In 1979, the land was purchased from Pennsylvania Gas & Water Co. for $14 million (equivalent to $ million in ). Construction began in January 1984 and was completed in time for the grand opening in December.

Lackawanna County purchased the ski resort in 1991 for $14.7 million (equivalent to $ million in ).

In 2006, Lackawanna County sold the ski area to Sno Mountain, LP, a Philadelphia-based investment group, for $5.1 million. The ski area was renamed Snö Mountain. Sno Mountain, LP filed a Chapter 11 petition for bankruptcy in 2012, claiming upwards of $24 million in debt. National Penn Bank purchased the property at auction for $4.6 million in March 2013. The original name, Montage Mountain, was restored in May 2013 when the area was sold to real estate company Jefferson-Werner for $5.1 million.

Terrain 
Montage opened to the public in 1984 with seven trails and three fixed-grip triple chairlifts. An experts-only North Face complex was opened in 1987. North Face featured one black diamond trail (Cannonball) and two double-black diamond trails (Smoke and Boomer). A third double-black-diamond trail, White Lightning, was added in the late 1990s. North Face is served by a fixed-grip quad chairlift.

Skiing at Montage Mountain

Montage Mountain has 27 ski and snowboard trails, including White Lightning, the 2nd steepest trail in the Eastern United States.  It has a mid-mountain lodge with a full service bar and restaurant open to the public during open seasons. Above the lodge are beginner and intermediate slopes. Below the lodge are advanced and expert slopes. This advanced area is locally known as North Face; it features the steepest skiing in Pennsylvania. Montage Mountain has two terrain parks with jumps, rails, and features ranging from beginner to expert. Montage also has a gladed ski trail.

Trails
Beginner trails (green) are the Learning Area, Limited (the bunny slope), Runaround, Easy Street, Highball, and Mainline. Intermediate trails (blue) are Spike, Switch, Whistler, Upper Runaway, Upper Fast Track, Snake, Nordic, Sidewinder, and the Glades. Advanced trails (black diamond) are Lower Fast Track, Lower Runaway, Rattler, and Cannonball. Expert trails (double-black diamond) are Smoke, Boomer and White Lightning. White Lightning is the signature slope of Montage Mountain.

Mountain Statistics

Lifts
5 fixed-grip chairlifts:
Shuttle (triple)
Short Haul (double)
Iron Horse (triple)
Long Haul (triple)
Phoebe Snow (quad)

2 magic carpet lifts
One along the snow tubing tracks; 
One for beginning skiers.

Trails
The trail difficulty breakdown is:
35% beginner
30% intermediate
20% advanced
15% expert

There is also a snow tubing area.

Summer

Montage Mountain Waterpark is located on ski area grounds. It features six water attractions including a lazy river, wave pool, tornado (ProSlide ride), and water slides. Dry attractions include batting cages, beach volleyball, tetherball, mini-golf, and the ZipRider, a  quad cable ride.

References

External links
Official Montage Mountain Website

Ski areas and resorts in Pennsylvania
Tourist attractions in Scranton, Pennsylvania
Buildings and structures in Scranton, Pennsylvania